Apud may refer to:

People
 Alejandro Apud, Uruguayan football manager
 Antonio Apud, Argentine footballer

Other
 apud, an expression of Latin origin
 APUD cells, a group of endocrine cells